Brazil–Mexico relations are the diplomatic and bilateral relations between the Federative Republic of Brazil and the United Mexican States. Together, Brazil and Mexico account as the most populous nations in Latin America and both nations have the largest global emerging economies and are considered to be regional powers. Both countries are members of the Community of Latin American and Caribbean States, G-20 major economies, Latin American Integration Association, Organization of American States, Organization of Ibero-American States and the United Nations.

Country comparison

History 

The first contact between Brazil and Mexico took place in August 1824 when both nations exchanged communications through their respective diplomatic representations in London. Both nations extended mutual recognition as independent States and decided to start negotiations to establish diplomatic relations. Diplomatic relations between Brazil and Mexico were established on 9 March 1825. In 1831, both nations established resident diplomatic missions in each other's capitals respectively. During the 1860s, both nations were the only Latin American countries to be governed by monarchs; in Brazil by Emperor Pedro II and in Mexico by Emperor Maximilian I; both emperors being cousins.

In 1914, Brazil belonged to a regional group called the ABC nations (which also included Argentina and Chile). These three nations made up the richest and most influential nations in South America at the time. That year, the ABC nations intervened in a diplomatic dispute between the United States and Mexico who were on verge of war over the Tampico Affair and the subsequent occupation of Veracruz by US forces. The ABC nations met with representatives of the United States and Mexico in Niagara Falls, Canada to ease the tension between the two nations and to avoid war, which afterwards did not occur.

Between 1910 and 1920, diplomatic relations between Brazil and Mexico were severed during the Mexican revolution. Diplomatic relations were re-reestablished in 1920 when Brazil recognized the new Mexican government. In 1922, diplomatic missions in each other's capitals were upgraded to embassies, respectively. During World War II, both Brazil and Mexico were the only two Latin American nations to declare war on the Axis powers and to send troops to fight abroad. Brazil sent an expeditionary force to fight in Italy while Mexico sent the 201st Fighter Squadron to fight in the Philippines. In 1960, President Adolfo López Mateos became the first Mexican head-of-state to pay an official visit to Brazil. The visit was reciprocated with the visit to Mexico by Brazilian President João Goulart in 1962. Since the initial visits, there have been several high-level visits by leaders of both nations.

On 1 June 2002, Mexico and Brazil signed an Economic Complementation Agreement (known as ACE 53). In accordance with the decision of Mexican President Enrique Peña Nieto and Brazilian President Dilma Rousseff in July 2015, the First Round of Negotiations of the Economic Complementation Agreement was held in Mexico City, and both leaders discussed the parameters of the negotiations and discussed the potential creation of and improved access to markets; rules of origin and trade facilitation; international trade rules (technical barriers to trade, regulatory coherence, sanitary and phytosanitary measures, competition policy, intellectual property, public procurement); services and investment, and dispute resolution.

Both nations have worked closely in multinational forums on mutual objectives. In 2018, Mexican President Enrique Peña Nieto and CEO of Pemex, Emilio Lozoya Austin, were accused of receiving bribes from Brazilian multinational conglomerate company, Odebrecht, in one of the world's largest corruption scandals.

High-level visits

Presidential visits from Brazil to Mexico

 President João Goulart (1962)
 President Ernesto Geisel (1978)
 President João Figueiredo (1983)
 President José Sarney (1987)
 President Fernando Collor de Mello (1991)
 President Fernando Henrique Cardoso (1996, 1999, 2002)
 President Luiz Inácio Lula da Silva (2007, 2010)
 President Dilma Rousseff (2012, 2015)
 President Michel Temer (2018)

Presidential visits from Mexico to Brazil

 President Adolfo López Mateos (1960)
 President Luis Echeverría (1974)
 President José López Portillo (1980)
 President Miguel de la Madrid Hurtado (1984)
 President Carlos Salinas de Gortari (1990, 1993)
 President Ernesto Zedillo (1999)
 President Vicente Fox (2002, 2004)
 President Felipe Calderón (2009)

Bilateral agreements
Both nations have signed numerous bilateral agreement such as an Arbitration Agreement; Commerce Agreement; Agreement for the revision of Texts for the Teaching of History and Geography; Extradition Treaty; Agreement for Scientific and Technical Cooperation; Agreement for Touristic Cooperation;  Agreement on Industrial Cooperation; Agreement on Cultural and Educational Cooperation; Agreement of Cooperation on the Environment; Agreement on Air Services; Agreement of Cooperation to Combat Drug Trafficking and Drug Dependency; Agreement for the Establishment of a Regional Center for Teaching Space Science and Technology for Latin America and the Caribbean; Agreement to Prevent Double Taxation and Prevent Tax Evasion in Tax Matters on Income; and a Treaty of Cooperation on Mutual Legal Assistance in Criminal Matters.

Transportation
There are direct flights between both nations with the following airlines: Aeroméxico, Gol Transportes Aéreos and LATAM Brasil.

Trade relations 
At a 2009 heads of state conference then Brazilian president Lula da Silva commented that there was "mistrust" between the two countries that needed to be overcome in order to increase trade, which he stated was a goal.  He proposed further high-level talks aimed at strengthening ties between the two countries' national oil companies, Petrobras and Pemex.  Mexican president Felipe Calderón stated that Mexico wanted to diversify its trade away from over-reliance on the United States and hoped to finish a free trade agreement between the two countries that has been in negotiation since 2000. Shortly after his election in 2012 Mexican president Enrique Peña Nieto criticized cuts to Brazil quotas of imported Mexican-built automobiles, and restated Mexico's interest in a free trade agreement.

In 2018, two-way trade between both nations amounted to US$10.1 billion. Brazil's main exports to Mexico include: goods for the iron and steel industry; vehicles and parts; frozen rooster and chicken offal and sulfate pulp. Mexico's main exports to Brazil include: vehicles with reciprocating piston engine; vehicle parts and terephthalic acid and its salts. Between 1999 and 2017, Brazilian companies invested US$5 billion in Mexico. Brazil is the largest foreign direct investor from Latin America in Mexico and the 13th largest globally. At the same time, Mexico has contributed over US$22 billion in foreign direct investment in Brazil, also becoming the largest Latin American investor in the country. In 2015, 128 Mexican companies invested in Brazil. Several Mexican multinational companies such as Alpek, Alsea, América Móvil, Cemex, Coppel, and Grupo Bimbo (among others) operate in Brazil. At the same time, 17 Brazilian companies invest in Mexico and several Brazilian multinational companies such as Embraer, Marfrig, Odebrecht and Petrobras (among others) operate in Mexico.

Resident diplomatic missions 
 Brazil has an embassy in Mexico City.
 Mexico has an embassy in Brasília and consulates-general in Rio de Janeiro and São Paulo.

See also

Brazilian Mexicans

References 

 
Mexico
Bilateral relations of Mexico